Gervė is a river of Biržai district municipality, Panevėžys County, northern Lithuania. It is a right tributary of the Aukštoji Gervė.

References
 

Rivers of Lithuania
Biržai District Municipality